Sian Honnor (née Gordon) (born 14 January 1988, in Canterbury) is an English international lawn bowler from Whitstable.

Bowls career

Outdoors
She first represented England on the world stage when she competed in the Youth Commonwealth Games in Bendigo in 2004, winning a bronze medal in the mixed pairs with Jamie Chestney.

She represented England at the 2010 Commonwealth Games where she won, with Jamie-Lea Winch and Sandy Hazell, a bronze medal in the woman's triples competition.

At the 2011 Atlantic Bowls Championships, Gordon won Gold in the Ladies Fours and Ladies Team Events. She won Gold in the Ladies Fours with Julie Saunders, Ellen Falkner and Amy Gowshall. Gordon competed in the 2014 Commonwealth Games and won Gold in the Ladies Triples event with Sophie Tolchard and Ellen Falkner. in 2014 she was a National triples champion.

She was selected as part of the English team for the 2018 Commonwealth Games on the Gold Coast in Queensland where she won a bronze medal in the Triples with Katherine Rednall and Ellen Falkner.

In 2019 she won the triples gold medal at the Atlantic Bowls Championships and in 2020 she was selected for the 2020 World Outdoor Bowls Championship in Australia.

In 2022, she competed in the women's triples and the Women's fours at the 2022 Commonwealth Games.
She won the gold medal in the triples with Jamie Lea Winch and Natalie Chestney.

Indoors
She has won numerous national titles including the English Indoor Bowling Association Women's Singles, National Under 25 singles twice, National Fours twice and National Triples.

Personal life
She works in PR in the higher education sector. She is a former editor for 'Bowls International' magazine and commentates for the BBC during the World Indoor Bowls Championships.

References

Living people
1988 births
Bowls players at the 2010 Commonwealth Games
Bowls players at the 2014 Commonwealth Games
Bowls players at the 2018 Commonwealth Games
Bowls players at the 2022 Commonwealth Games
English female bowls players
Sportspeople from Canterbury
People from Whitstable
Commonwealth Games medallists in lawn bowls
Commonwealth Games gold medallists for England
Commonwealth Games bronze medallists for England
British sports broadcasters
Sports commentators
Medallists at the 2022 Commonwealth Games